Anthony Dyson may refer to:

 A. E. Dyson (1928–2002), British literary critic, lecturer, educational activist and gay rights campaigner
 Anthony Dyson (priest) (1935–1998), priest in the Church of England and professor of theology
 Tony Dyson (1947–2016), British special effects designer